Boston Emergency Medical Services (Boston EMS) provides basic life support (BLS) and advanced life support (ALS) ambulance units throughout the neighborhoods in the city of Boston, Massachusetts, USA.  Boston EMS is a public safety agency responding to 911 calls alone or with the Boston Police and/or Boston Fire Departments dependent upon the nature of an incident. The agency employs over 400 emergency medical technicians (EMT) and paramedics.  

Boston EMS is a bureau of the City of Boston Public Health Commission.  Boston EMS hires Massachusetts State certified EMTs by competitive examination and upon completion of the Boston EMS Recruit Academy, and then promotes paramedics from within the department after completing an intense internship.  The department is managed by a uniformed command staff consisting of a Chief of Department, a Superintendent-in-Chief, three Superintendents, and eleven Deputy Superintendents.  

There are sixteen ambulance stations located throughout the city.  Field operations are commanded by a Deputy Superintendent (Shift Commander) and assisted by 2 Lieutenants (Field Supervisors) operating in 2 Divisions.  A third impact Lieutenant is deployed as needed and during major citywide events.  All department vehicles are equipped with Global Positioning (GPS) and Mobile Data Terminals (MDT).  An EMT is assigned to the Boston Police Harbor Unit from mid spring though late fall.      

Boston EMS maintains a fully staffed Special Operations Unit which includes a heavy duty rescue truck, two medium duty rescue trucks, a state-of-the-art MCI bus, support trailers, ATV's and a bike team for special events and major incidents.  In addition, several other specialized units provide logistical/technical support for Boston EMS operations, including a modern Dispatch Operations Center (staffed by EMTs) located in Boston Police Headquarters, the Training Division, a Community Initiatives Office and Administration & Finance office.  The Materials Management Unit provides 24-hour equipment/supply services and the Fleet Services Unit maintain an inventory of approximately 120 department vehicles.  There are also Facilities and Communications Engineering sections.

Boston EMS is a unionized department with EMT's and Paramedics represented by the Boston Police Patrolmen's Association, EMS Division; Support Services staff represented by the American Federation of State, County and Municipal Employees (AFSCME);  Command Staff represented by SENA, and civilian office/clerical staff represented by SEIU.

The Boston EMS ambulance fleet consists of Braun ambulances mounted on International TerraStar, and Ford F-450 Super Duty chassis.

History
Boston EMS traces its history to the Boston City Hospital Ambulance Service, formed in 1892, and it remained a division of the City of Boston Health & Hospitals Department through 1996, at which time Boston EMS became a bureau of the newly created Boston Public Health Commission.

After 36 years of service with Boston EMS, Chief of Department Richard Serino retired in October 2009 to accept the position of Deputy Administrator of the Federal Emergency Management Agency (FEMA) after nomination and confirmation by the US Senate.

On January 25, 2010, Mayor Thomas Menino appointed Superintendent-in-Chief James Hooley, a 32 year veteran of Boston EMS as the new Chief of Department. On June 7, 2010, Superintendent Brendan Kearney was appointed Superintendent in-Chief of the department.

On April 15, 2013, Boston EMS was the primary medical response agency to the Boston Marathon bombing.

Ranks
The Boston EMS rank structure is as follows:

Regimental Pipes and Drums Corps
The Boston EMS Regimental Pipes and Drums Corps is one of the first dedicated EMS uniformed pipe and drum bands in the United States, and was formed in 1998.

References

External links
Boston Police Patrolman's Association - EMS Division

Government of Boston
Ambulance services in the United States
Medical and health organizations based in Massachusetts